Agnes "Aggie" Beever-Jones (born 27 July 2003) is an English footballer who plays as a forward for Everton on loan from Chelsea in the FA Women's Super League.

Club career

Chelsea 
A product of the Chelsea academy, Beever-Jones made her senior debut for the Blues in a 4–0 away win over Aston Villa at Banks's Stadium on 27 January 2021. On 16 April, she was handed her first start in a 5–0 home victory against the London City Lionesses in the fourth round of the Women's FA Cup.

Bristol City 
She was loaned out to Bristol City for the 2021–22 FA Women's Championship, and came off the bench on the opening day to score a late consolation goal in a 4–3 loss to Crystal Palace.

Everton 
In August 2022 Beever-Jones went on loan to Everton. She started as a forward in Everton's opening game of the 2022–23 WSL season.

International career 
Beever-Jones has represented England at multiple youth levels, from under-15 up to under-19. In October 2019, she was named to the under-17 squad for the first round of the 2020 UEFA Women's Under-17 Championship qualifiers, and played against Croatia, Bosnia and Herzegovina and Belgium. On 24 October, she scored once against Bosnia. However, the final tournament was cancelled due to the COVID-19 pandemic in Europe.

Career statistics

Club 
.

References

External links 
 

2003 births
Living people
English women's footballers
Women's Super League players
Chelsea F.C. Women players
Bristol City W.F.C. players
Women's Championship (England) players
Women's association football forwards
England women's youth international footballers